The Smurfs is a Belgian computer-animated television series developed by Dupuis Audiovisuel, IMPS, and Peyo Productions, in association with KiKA, Ketnet, RTBF and Dargaud Media, with the participation of TF1, and was based on the Belgian comic book series of the same name created by Peyo.

It originally premiered in Belgium on April 18, 2021 on La Trois (the RTBF channel), during the OUFtivi programming block. 

In Switzerland, the series premiered on April 25, 2021 on RTS Un, during the RTS Kids programming block.

In France, the series premiered on May 9, 2021 on TF1, within the programming block, TFOU.
And in Québec from August 28, 2021 in Télé-Québec, under the title Les Schtroumpfs 3D.

In the United States, the series debuted on Nickelodeon on September 10, 2021. 

In Germany, the series premiered on KiKa on April 16, 2022.

The world premiere of Season 2 was in the United States on Nickelodeon on July 18, 2022. In Belgium on OUFtivi, it premiered on August 29, 2022. In France on TFOU, it premiered on October 5, 2022.

Series overview

Episodes

Season 1 (2021–22)
Alexandre Viano supervised the storyboard of each episode.

Season 2 (2022–23)

References

External links
 
 The Smurfs at RTBF 
 The Smurfs at TF1 
 The Smurfs at Nickelodeon
 
The Smurfs
Smurfs
Lists of children's television series episodes